is a former Japanese football player.

Playing career
Sugimoto was born in Shizuoka on June 26, 1967. After graduating from Juntendo University, he joined Yamaha Motors in 1990. He played many matches as midfielder from first season. In 1993, he moved to Shimizu S-Pulse. Although he played many matches in 1993, his opportunity to play decreased from 1994. He retired end of 1996 season.

Club statistics

References

External links

geocities.co.jp

1967 births
Living people
Juntendo University alumni
Association football people from Shizuoka Prefecture
Japanese footballers
Japan Soccer League players
J1 League players
Japan Football League (1992–1998) players
Júbilo Iwata players
Shimizu S-Pulse players
Association football midfielders